This is a chronological list of deputy prime ministers of governments of the Republic of Turkey. Deputy Prime Minister was an office under the prime ministry between 1946 and 2018. Not all cabinets had the post of deputy prime minister. The political party of the deputy prime minister is affixed to his name when it differed from the prime minister's party as it was the case in coalition governments.
Deputy Prime Minister of Turkey abolished together with the Prime Ministry's in 2018.

See also 
 List of prime ministers of Turkey

 
Deputy Prime Ministers
Turkey